Espace is an Egyptian software company. It was founded in 2000 by eight graduates, inspired by the start-up fever in Silicon Valley at the time. It became a leader in the field of web scalability solutions.

The company partnered with the Egyptian government to create a website to help facilitate elections in Egypt.

References

Information technology companies of Egypt
Companies based in Alexandria
Election technology companies
Companies established in 2000